Richard Allan Bartle FBCS FRSA (born 10 January 1960) is a British writer, professor and game researcher in the massively multiplayer online game industry. He co-created MUD1 (the first MUD) in 1978, and is the author of the 2003 book Designing Virtual Worlds.

Life and career
In 1988, Bartle received a PhD in artificial intelligence from the University of Essex, where as an undergraduate, he created MUD1 with Roy Trubshaw in 1978.

He lectured at Essex until 1987, when he left to work full-time on MUD (known as MUD2 in its present version). Recently he has returned to the university as a part-time professor and principal teaching fellow in the Department of Computing and Electronic Systems, supervising courses on computer game design as part of the department's degree course on computer game development.

He is a Fellow of the Royal Society of Arts.

In 2003, he wrote Designing Virtual Worlds, a book about the history, ethics, structure, and technology of massively multiplayer games.

Bartle is also a contributing editor to Terra Nova, a collaborative blog that deals with virtual world issues.

Bartle did research on player personality types in virtual worlds. In Bartle's analysis, players of virtual worlds can be divided into four types: achievers, explorers, socializers and killers. This idea has been adapted into an online test generally referred to as the Bartle Test, which is quite popular, with scores often exchanged on massively multiplayer online games forums and networking sites.

Circa 2003, Bartle was reported as living in a village near Colchester, England, with his wife Gail and their two children Jennifer and Madeleine.. 

Bartle is an atheist and a patron of Humanists UK.

Awards 
 International Game Developers Association "First Penguin Award" (now called "The Pioneer Award"), at the 2005 Game Developers Choice Awards, for his part in creating the first MUD.
 Game Developers Choice Online "The Online Game Legend Award", at the 2010 Game Developers Choice Awards

Works

Games
 Spellbinder, 1977, a paper-and-pencil game also known as Waving Hands, first described in Bartle's fanzine Sauce of the Nile
 MUD1, 1978, with Roy Trubshaw
 MUD2, 1980, based on MUD1
 Spunky Princess, 2015, based on wap

Books
 Artificial Intelligence and Computer Games, Paperback, 256 pages, Century Communications, 25 July 1985, 
 Designing Virtual Worlds, Paperback, 768 pages, New Riders Pub., 25 July 2003 
 INsightflames, 1999, Online publication. Also 2 Paperbacks, NotByUs, "IN Sight", 422 pages, July 2007,  & "IN Flames", 416 pages, August 2007, 
 Lizzie Lott's Sovereign, NotByUs, June 2011, ASIN B0058CX7M8
 MMOs from the Outside In: The Massively-Multiplayer Online Role-Playing Games of Psychology, Law, Government, and Real Life, Apress, December 2015, ASIN B01FGP30K0
 MMOs from the Inside Out: The History, Design, Fun, and Art of Massively-multiplayer Online Role-playing Games, Apress, December 2015, ASIN B01FGP30K0
 How to Be a God: A Guide for Would-Be Deities, NotByUs, 2022, ISBN 978-0-9556494-9-3

References

External links 

 
 Richard Bartle's blog
 
 
 MUD history page
 Terra Nova collaborative blog
 Sci-Tech Today, 4 January 2006, "Inside the Underground Economy of Computer Gaming" (see page 4)
 GameSpy interview, 27 October 2003
 GameZombie.tv, Videotaped Discussion of Hero's Journey with Lee Sheldon
 INsightflames HTML and PDF versions of the book, and link to the 2-volume print version at Cafe Press
Interview with Dr. Richard Bartle at GDC Online 2010
 Richard A. Bartle papers housed at Stanford University Libraries

1960 births
Alumni of the University of Essex
Academics of the University of Essex
British technology writers
British video game designers
British computer programmers
Living people
Metaplace
MUD developers
MUD scholars
Video game researchers
Game Developers Conference Pioneer Award recipients